KREB (1190 AM) is a radio station licensed to Bentonville, Arkansas, United States. It serves the Fayetteville (North West Arkansas) area. The station is currently owned by John Lykins and Steve Butler, through licensee Rox Radio Group, LLC. In the mid-1960s the KREB call sign was a small rock & roll AM station in Shreveport, Louisiana. Before being sold in 1962, it had converted to "pop" music to boost time sales before going under.

References

External links

REB
ESPN Radio stations
Radio stations established in 1968
1968 establishments in Arkansas
REB